Academic Engineers and Architects in Finland TEK is a Finnish trade union of university-educated engineers, architects and scientists. In addition, the TEK is a learned society and the professional body of the engineering profession. The union requires that its full members have a master's degree or equivalent in engineering, architecture, mathematics, physics or in other sciences related to technology.

History 
The TEK was founded in 1896 as the association of Finnish-speaking engineering professionals (Suomenkielisten teknikkojen seura). In early years, it was mainly a learned society, which aimed to promote the use of Finnish language in the engineering profession dominated by the Swedish language. During the World War I, the activities of the association widened into wider sphere of Engineering and Economics. In 1936, the association differentiated itself from the engineers and technicians who had graduated from polytechnics, and started to require a master's degree in engineering of its members. This was signalled also in the name Suomen teknillinen seura (Finnish technological society), which excluded technicians.

The World War II brought about inflation which severely affected the middle classes earning fixed salaries. Little by little, the association increased its activities as the lobbying body of the engineering profession, starting to offer continuing education and pursuing studies on the social and economic standing of its membership. In 1972, the Finnish-speaking STS and its Swedish-speaking counterpart Tekniska föreningen i Finland (TFiF) formed a common trade union KAL, which started to negotiate collectively with the employers as a full-scale trade union. In 1978, the KAL started to insure its members against unemployment and in 1984, the Finnish Association of Mathematicians and Physicists (SMFL) gave the KAL a mandate to negotiate on its behalf.

The present structure of the association was formed in 1993, as the KAL and the STS, which had been in close cooperation for two decades, converged into the TEK. At the same time, the Swedish-speaking TFiF and the SMFL remained separate, although all members of the SMFL are automatically also members of the TEK.

Activities 
The TEK has delegated its right to negotiate collectively to two organizations. In the public sector, the JUKO (Educated employees of the public sector) negotiates collectively with the state and municipal governments for all university-level employees. In the private sector, the YTN (Negotiating organization of the upper-level salaried employees) is the body responsible for the collective agreements of university-educated staff. Although rather moderate in its bargaining, the YTN went to strike in 2007 when the collective negotiations in the industrial design bureau branch broke up. The strike included some 6,000 engineers and scientists and lasted 11 days, resulting in a slightly better collective agreement than had been offered earlier by the employers.

As the learned society of engineering profession, the TEK engages in public discussion on the technology, engineering education and research. This contribution is supported by the studies conducted by its staff. In particular, the TEK supports active state participation in and financing of the R&D activities. Perhaps the most visible single activity of the TEK is the annual Finnish Engineering Award which is awarded to an outstanding achievement of original engineering or architectural work. As the main body of the engineering profession of Finland, the TEK has since 1966 published the Engineer's rule of honour, the ethical guidelines of engineering profession. The latest edition of the rule is from 1996.

For its members, the TEK offers the usual services provided by Finnish trade union.

References 

Finnish Association of Graduate Engineers
Engineering societies based in Finland
1896 establishments in Finland
Trade unions in Finland